Rhizocarpon haidense is a species of crustose lichen in the family Rhizocarpaceae. Found in Canada, it was described as a new species in 2020 by lichenologists Irwin Brodo and Alan Fryday. The type specimen was collected from the Skincuttle Inlet area of Moresby Island (Haida Gwaii, British Columbia). Here it was found on the edge of a beach, growing on a rock at the base of a cliff. The specific epithet haidense references the type locality in Haida Gwaii.

References

Rhizocarpaceae
Lichen species
Lichens described in 2020
Lichens of Western Canada
Taxa named by Irwin Brodo
Fungi without expected TNC conservation status